Dr. Stone is a 2019 television anime series produced by TMS Entertainment based on the manga of the same name written by Riichiro Inagaki, illustrated by Boichi, and published in Shueisha's Weekly Shōnen Jump magazine. 3,700 years after a mysterious light turns every human on the planet into stone, genius boy Senku Ishigami emerges from his petrification into a "Stone World" and seeks to rebuild human civilization from the ground up. 

Dr. Stones second season, subtitled Dr. Stone: Stone Wars''', aired from January 14 to March 25, 2021. It focused on the story of the "Stone Wars" arc from the manga series. In Stone Wars, Senku and the Ishigami villagers of the Kingdom of Science go to war with Tsukusa's Kingdom of Strength. The season is streamed by Crunchyroll worldwide outside of Asia, and Funimation is currently producing a simuldub. It ran for 11 episodes. A sequel to the TV series was announced after second season's final episode aired. The English dub of Stone Wars'' began airing on Adult Swim's Toonami programming block on May 16, 2021.


Episode list

Notes

References

External links
 

2021 Japanese television seasons
Dr. Stone episode lists